Lucio "Lou" Rossini (April 24, 1921 – October 21, 2005) was an American college basketball coach. He compiled a 357–256 record in almost 20 years of coaching, most notably with New York University (NYU).

In Rossini's first year as head coach with Columbia University, he guided them to a 21–1 record and an appearance in the 1951 NCAA basketball tournament. After Columbia, Rossini coached at NYU, leading them to three NCAA tournament appearances and four National Invitation Tournament (NIT) bids in 13 seasons.  Rossini last coached in the NCAA for St. Francis College in Brooklyn, from 1975 to 1979, and had a 55–48 record. He also coached the Puerto Rican national team in the 1964 and 1968 Olympics and the Qatar national team in the 1980s.

Two of his best players at NYU were Happy Hairston and Barry Kramer, who starred on the 1963 and 1964 teams. Hairston and Kramer advanced to professional careers. He also coached Puerto Rico's national team at the 1964 and 1968 Olympics.

Rossini died at his home in the Sewell section of Mantua Township, New Jersey, aged 84. The cause of death was Alzheimer's disease.

Head coaching record

See also
 List of NCAA Division I Men's Final Four appearances by coach

References

1921 births
2005 deaths
American men's basketball coaches
American men's basketball players
American people of Italian descent
Basketball coaches from New York (state)
Basketball players from New York City
Columbia Lions men's basketball coaches
Columbia Lions men's basketball players
Deaths from dementia in New Jersey
Deaths from Alzheimer's disease
New York University faculty
NYU Violets men's basketball coaches
People from Mantua Township, New Jersey
Sportspeople from the Bronx
St. Francis Brooklyn Terriers men's basketball coaches
St. John's Red Storm men's basketball players